The World Heritage Committee is a committee of the United Nations Educational, Scientific and Cultural Organization that selects the sites to be listed as UNESCO World Heritage Sites, including the World Heritage List and the List of World Heritage in Danger, defines the use of the World Heritage Fund and allocates financial assistance upon requests from States Parties. It comprises representatives from 21 state parties that are elected by the General Assembly of States Parties for a four-year term. These parties vote on decisions and proposals related to the World Heritage Convention and World Heritage List. 

According to the World Heritage Convention, a committee member's term of office is six years. However many States Parties choose to voluntarily limit their term to four years, in order to give other States Parties an opportunity to serve.  All members elected at the 15th General Assembly (2005) voluntarily chose to reduce their term of office from six to four years.

Deliberations of the World Heritage Committee are aided by three advisory bodies, the IUCN, ICOMOS and ICCROM.

Sessions

The World Heritage Committee meets once a year for an ordinary session to discuss the management of existing World Heritage Sites, and accept nominations by countries. Extraordinary meetings can be convened at the request of two-thirds of the state members. Meetings are held within the territory of state members of the World Heritage Committee at their invitation. Rotation between regions and cultures is a consideration for selection and the location for the next session is chosen by the committee at the end of each session.

Bureau 
At the end of each ordinary session, the committee elects a chairperson, five vice-chairpersons and a Rapporteur from those members whose term will continue through the next session. These are known as the Bureau, and their representatives are responsible for coordinating the work of the World Heritage Committee, including fixing dates, hours and the order of business meetings.

Voting 
Each state member of the World Heritage Committee has one vote. Decisions require a simple majority with abstentions counted as not voting. Votes are delivered by a show of hands unless a secret ballot is requested by either the chairperson or two or more states members.

Members
Current members of the UNESCO World Heritage Committee

Criticism 
Increasing politicization of World Heritage Committee decisions to the detriment of conservation aims has been alleged, particularly with regard to new nominations for the World Heritage List, but also with the consideration of sites for the List of World Heritage in Danger. In 2010, states parties including Hungary, Switzerland and Zimbabwe submitted an official protest against such politicization.

An external audit requested by the World Heritage Committee for its Global Strategy of the World Heritage List concluded in 2011 that political considerations were indeed influencing decisions. It observed that the composition of committee representatives had shifted from experts to diplomats in spite of World Heritage Convention Article 9 and found that opinions from advisory bodies often diverged from World Heritage Committee decisions.

In 2016, Israel recalled its UNESCO ambassador after the World Heritage Committee adopted a resolution in a secret ballot that referred to one of Jerusalem's holiest sites, the Temple Mount, only as a "Muslim holy site of worship", not mentioning that Jews and Christians venerate the site.

See also
 Lists of World Heritage Sites

References

External links

 UNESCO World Heritage portal – official website 
 The World Heritage List – official searchable list of all Inscribed Properties

UNESCO Conventions
Heritage organizations
International cultural organizations
Nature conservation organizations
Organizations established in 1977